Kwai Tsing Container Terminals is the main port facilities in the reclamation along Rambler Channel between Kwai Chung and Tsing Yi Island, Hong Kong. It evolved from four berths of Kwai Chung Container Port completed in the 1970s. It later expanded with two berths in the 1980s. Two additional terminals are added adjoining to Stonecutters Island in the 1990s and was renamed Kwai Chung Container Terminals. In the 2000s, Container Terminal 9 on the Tsing Yi Island was completed and the entire facility was renamed to Kwai Tsing Container Terminals.

It has been the eighth-busiest container port in the world since 2019, just after Shanghai, Singapore, Ningbo-Zhoushan, Shenzhen, Guangzhou, Busan and Qingdao.

History
The Container Committee was appointed by the Governor Sir David Trench on 12 July 1966 to advise the government on the containerisation revolution in cargo handling. In early 1967 the committee declared that Hong Kong had to build the capacity to handle containers, lest the territory's economy would suffer and its port would get bypassed in favour of Singapore and Japan. The committee recommended the site at Kwai Chung. Two former islands on the Rambler Channel, Mong Chau and Pillar Island, were levelled and buried under the port.

While the port was under construction, a main road Kwai Chung Road was built to connect Kwai Chung and Kowloon. Container Port Road, a branch road of Kwai Chung Road, links the port with major industrial areas in Hong Kong.

The first container vessel to call on the new terminal, on 5 September 1972, was the Tokyo Bay.

Thanks to the success of the Kwai Chung Port, Hong Kong overtook New York City in 1986 as the world's second-busiest port. In 1987 it seized the title of world's busiest port from Rotterdam.

Terminals
The port consists of nine container terminals and their operators:

^ HIT terminals 4, 6, 7 and 9 (North): 14.2 to 16.0 metre

See also

Port of Hong Kong

Notes

Transport in Hong Kong
Ports and harbours of Hong Kong
Kwai Tsing District
Kwai Chung
Lai King
Tsing Yi
Stonecutters Island
Container terminals